Jane Caroline Smith (born 5 April 1969) is a British Olympic field hockey team member. She represented England and won a silver medal, at the 1998 Commonwealth Games in Kuala Lumpur. Four years later she won another silver medal at the 2002 Commonwealth Games.

References

External links
 
 
 

1969 births
Living people
English female field hockey players
Olympic field hockey players of Great Britain
British female field hockey players
Field hockey players at the 1998 Commonwealth Games
Field hockey players at the 2000 Summer Olympics
Commonwealth Games silver medallists for England
Commonwealth Games medallists in field hockey
Medallists at the 1998 Commonwealth Games